Murat Başesgioğlu (born 1955) is a Turkish politician who was a Minister of State of Turkey and Member of the Turkish Parliament for Kastamonu for the ruling Adalet ve Kalkınma Partisi (AK Party).

Biography
Başesgioğlu was born in Kastamonu. He completed his primary and secondary education at Isfendiyar Bey primary school in Kastamonu. He later graduated in law from Istanbul University and has previously been member of parliament for the centre-right ANAP and the minister of the interior. After graduating, he worked as a freelance lawyer for seven years and was registered to the Kastamonu Bar Council. Having resigned from ANAP he joined the AK Party. He also resigned from Adalet ve Kalkınma Partisi in 2010 due to opposition to the party's parliamentary policies. He later went and joined the Nationalist Movement Party on 28 January 2011.

He can speak French.

References

 Who is who database - Biography of Murat Başesgioğlu

External links
 Murat Başesgioğlu's official website

Ministers of the Interior of Turkey
Living people
1955 births
Justice and Development Party (Turkey) politicians
Deputies of Istanbul
Ministers of Youth and Sports of Turkey
Motherland Party (Turkey) politicians
Ministers of Labour and Social Security of Turkey
People from Kastamonu
Members of the 25th Parliament of Turkey
Members of the 24th Parliament of Turkey
Members of the 23rd Parliament of Turkey
Members of the 22nd Parliament of Turkey
Members of the 21st Parliament of Turkey
Members of the 20th Parliament of Turkey
Ministers of State of Turkey
Members of the 60th government of Turkey
Istanbul University Faculty of Law alumni